Lisa Fruchtman (born August 1948) is an American film and television editor, and documentary director with about 25 film credits. Fruchtman won the Academy Award for Best Film Editing for The Right Stuff (1983). With her brother, Rob Fruchtman, she produced, directed, and edited the 2012 documentary Sweet Dreams.

Editing career
After her high school years, Lisa Fruchtman enrolled at the University of Chicago and received an A.B. degree there in 1970. She began her career as a film editor in Hollywood in 1973 with the documentary short Ten: The Magic Number. Fruchtman was an assistant to editors Barry Malkin, Richard Marks, and Peter Zinner on The Godfather Part II (1974), directed by Francis Ford Coppola. This film was edited to have a complex structure that weaves a contemporary story with a background story in Sicily at the turn of the 19th and 20th centuries; the film was nominated for the BAFTA Award for Best Editing.

Fruchtman was one of several editors hired by Coppola in 1977 for the post-production of Apocalypse Now. Coppola had shot about 250 hours of film that needed to be cut down to 2.5 hours for its theatrical release. Evan Lottman and Barry Malkin had done preliminary editing, but then dropped out of the project. The very difficult editing required nearly two years. The film was released in August, 1979. In 1980, she and her co-editors Richard Marks, Walter Murch, and Gerald B. Greenberg were nominated for the Academy Award for Best Film Editing, the ACE Eddie Award, and the BAFTA Award for Best Editing.

In 1984, she won the Oscar for Best Film Editing for The Right Stuff (1983), along with her co-editors Glenn Farr, Stephen A. Rotter, Douglas Stewart and Tom Rolf. The film was directed by Philip Kaufman. The editors were also nominated for the ACE Eddie Award for the film.

Fruchtman's first solo credit as editor for a major studio film was for Children of a Lesser God (1986), which was director Randa Haines' first major film as well. Fruchtman has cut two further films with Haines: The Doctor (1991), and Dance with Me (1998).

In 1991, she was nominated for another Oscar for Coppola's The Godfather Part III, together with her co-editors Barry Malkin and Walter Murch. All three editors had long experience working with Coppola, on the earlier Godfather films and others.

In 1996, Fruchtman received an additional nomination for an Eddie for the television film Truman, which was directed by Frank Pierson. The movie recounts the role of US President Harry S. Truman during World War II. She was also nominated for a Primetime Emmy Award (Outstanding Editing for a Miniseries or a Special - Single Camera Production).

In 2010, she received the Professional Achievement Award for alumni of the University of Chicago.

Filmography (selection)
This filmography is based on the listing at the Internet Movie Database. The director(s) of each film are indicated in the first parentheses.
 1973: Ten: The Magic Number (Nelson)
 1977: The Grateful Dead Movie (Garcia and Gast) (with Susan R. Crutcher, Jerry Garcia, and John Nutt)
 1979: Apocalypse Now (Coppola) (with Richard Marks, Walter Murch, and Gerald B. Greenberg)
 1980: Heaven's Gate (Cimino) (with Gerald Greenberg, William Reynolds, and Tom Rolf)
 1983: The Right Stuff (Kaufman) (with Glenn Farr, Stephen A. Rotter, Douglas Stewart, and Tom Rolf)
 1986: Children of a Lesser God (Haines)
 1986: Captain EO
 1990: The Godfather Part III (Coppola) (with Barry Malkin and Walter Murch)
 1991: The Doctor (Haines) (with Bruce Green)
 1993: Shimmer (Hanson)
 1997: My Best Friend's Wedding (Hogan) (with Garth Craven)
 1998: Dance with Me (Haines) (with William S. Scharf)
 2002: Teknolust (Leeson)
 2004: A Love Song for Bobby Long (Gabel) (with Lee Percy)
 2004: The Woodsman (Kassell) (with Brian A. Kates)
 2007: Bonneville (Rowley) (with Anita Brandt-Burgoyne)
 2010: Cinderella Moon (supervising)
 2012: Witness 11 (consulting)
 2012: Sweet Dreams (R. and L. Fruchtman) (producer, director, and editor)

References

1948 births
Living people
American documentary film directors
American film editors
Best Film Editing Academy Award winners
University of Chicago alumni
Place of birth missing (living people)
American women film editors
21st-century American women
American women documentary filmmakers